The 1995 Oklahoma Sooners football team represented the University of Oklahoma during the 1995 NCAA Division I-A football season. They played their home games at Oklahoma Memorial Stadium and competed as members of the Big Eight Conference. They were coached by Howard Schnellenberger.

Schedule

Personnel

Rankings

Season summary

San Diego State

SMU

North Texas

Colorado

at Iowa State

vs. Texas

Kansas

at Missouri

at Kansas State

Oklahoma State

at Nebraska

Postseason

NFL draft

The following players were drafted into the National Football League following the season.

References

Oklahoma
Oklahoma Sooners football seasons
Oklahoma Sooners football